Ján Brejčák (born 29 June 1989) is a Slovak professional ice hockey defenceman who is currently playing for HC '05 Banská Bystrica of the Slovak Extraliga.

Career
Brejčák came through the youth ranks of HK Poprad. He made his men's team debut during the 2006-07 season. In 2011, he joined the Czech team HC Litvinov, where he spent two years. From 2013 to 2015, Brejčák turned out for HC Slovan Bratislava of the Kontinental Hockey League.

After a tryout with HC Davos of the Swiss top-flight National League A (NLA), Brejčák was signed by HCD in August 2015.

National team
Brejčák made his debut on Slovakia's men's national team in 2011 and represented his country at the 2014 World Championships in Belarus.

Career statistics

Regular season and playoffs

International

References

External links
 

1989 births
Living people
Düsseldorfer EG players
HC '05 Banská Bystrica players
HC Davos players
HC Litvínov players
HC Stadion Litoměřice players
HC Slovan Bratislava players
HK Poprad players
HPK players
MHK Kežmarok players
Modo Hockey players
Slovak ice hockey defencemen
Storhamar Dragons players
Sportspeople from Poprad
Stavanger Oilers players
Slovak expatriate ice hockey players in the Czech Republic
Slovak expatriate ice hockey players in Germany
Slovak expatriate ice hockey players in Sweden
Slovak expatriate ice hockey players in Finland
Slovak expatriate ice hockey players in Switzerland
Expatriate ice hockey players in Norway
Slovak expatriate sportspeople in Norway